Prince Philip of Bourbon-Two Sicilies (Filippo Maria Alfonso Antonio Ferdinando Francesco di Paola Lodovico Enrico Alberto Taddeo Francesco Saverio Uberto; 10 December 1885 – 9 March 1949) was a member of the House of Bourbon-Two Sicilies and a Prince of Bourbon-Two Sicilies.

Family
Prince Philip was the tenth child of Prince Alfonso of Bourbon-Two Sicilies, Count of Caserta, and his wife, Princess Maria Antonietta of Bourbon-Two Sicilies.

Marriage and issue
Philip married firstly to Princess Marie Louise of Orléans, eldest daughter and child of Prince Emmanuel, Duke of Vendôme and his wife Princess Henriette of Belgium, on 12 January 1916 in Neuilly-sur-Seine. The couple had one child before their divorce in 1925:

 Prince Gaetano Maria Alfonso Enrico Paolo of Bourbon-Two Sicilies (born 16 April 1917 in Cannes; died 27 December 1984 in Harare). He renounced his title and dynastic membership in the House of Bourbon-Sicily on 24 February 1939 upon becoming a British subject. On 16 February 1946 he married Olivia Yarrow (born 16 July 1917 in Dumfries; died 24 May 1987 in Harare) in Paddington They had children:
Adrian Philip de Bourbon (born 7 April 1948 in Warrington)
∞ Linda Idensohn (born 3 February 1950 in Salisbury) on 20 March 1976 in Salisbury
Philip Charles de Bourbon (born 5 May 1977 in Harare)
Michelle Lara de Bourbon (born 12 February 1979 in Harare)
Gregory Peter de Bourbon (born 2 January 1950 in Warrington)
∞ Maureen Powell (born 19 April 1951 in Bulawayo) on 15 May 1971 in Rusape
Christan Peter de Bourbon (born 11 April 1974 in Vancouver)
Raymond Paul de Bourbon (born 8 November 1978 in Harare)
∞ Carrie Anne Thornley (born 2 February 1945 in Cessnock) on 30 August 1986 in Brisbane

Philip married secondly to Odette Labori, daughter of French attorney Fernand Labori, on 10 January 1927 in Paris. Philip and Odette did not have children.

Titles, styles and honours

Titles and styles
10 December 1885 – 9 March 1949: His Royal Highness Prince Philip of Bourbon-Two Sicilies

Honours
 :
 Grand Cross of the Order of Charles III, 8 October 1907
 Knight of the Order of the Golden Fleece, 5 January 1916
 Novice Knight of the Order of Alcántara

Ancestry

References

1885 births
1949 deaths
People from Cannes
Princes of Bourbon-Two Sicilies
French Roman Catholics
19th-century Roman Catholics
20th-century Roman Catholics
Knights of the Golden Fleece of Spain
Knights of the Order of Alcántara